Krenkerup is an old manor house located 3 km (2 mi) southwest of Sakskøbing on the Danish island of Lolland. It is one of Denmark's oldest estates and manors, documented as early as the 1330s. Between 1815 and 1938, it was known as Hardenberg.

History and architecture
The three-winged building stands on a narrow, rectangular mound surrounded by a moat. The original stone house from 1490 was extended by statesman Mogens Gøye with three new wings, forming an enclosed courtyard. A tower was added on the west side. In 1631, Palle Rosenkrantz built an extra storey on the north wing and an octagonal tower on the southeast corner. The south wing was destroyed by fire in 1689 and never rebuilt. The entire complex was renovated in 1780. From 1815 to 1838, Krenkerup was known as Hardenberg.

In 1731, the Reventlows established a family property consisting of Krenkerup, Rosenlund and Nørregård which in 1815 became the countyship of Hardenberg-Reventlow, including the subsidiary estates of Nielstrup, Sæbyholm and Christiansdal. It was dissolved in 1924.

Today it is an active agricultural concern and also houses a brewery and the only professional full size polo field in Denmark.

List of owners
 (1367–1411) Axel Mogensen Gøye
 (?–1392) Laurids Nielsen Kabel
 (1381–1392) Mogens Gøye
 (1411–?) Karen Madsdatter (married name: Gøye)
 (1411–1417) Oluf Axelsen Gøye
 (1411–1450) Mogens Axelsen Gøye
 (1417–?) Mette Christiernsdatter, (married names: Gøye, Jensen)
 (?–?) Jens Jensen
 (1417–1427) Evert Moltke
 (1417–1427) Mathias Moltke
 (1450–1506) Eskil Gøye
 (1506–1544) Mogens Gøye
 (1544) Birgitte Gøye (married name: Trolle)
 (1544–1558) Albrecht Gøye
 (1558–1594) Margrethe Albrechtsdatter Gøye, (married name: Brahe)
 (1558–1566) Otte Gøye
 (1558–?) Margrethe Gøye, (married name: Brahe)
 (? –1610) Peder Brahe
 (1610–1613) Axel Brahe
 (1613–1622) Otte Pedersen Brahe
 (1613–1622) Elisabeth Rosensparre (married names: Brahe, Rosenkrantz)
 (1622–1642) Palle Rosenkrantz
 (1642–1649) Lisbeth Lunge (married name: Rosenkrantz)
 (1649–1660) Jørgen Rosenkrantz
 (1660–1665) Mette Rosenkrantz
 (1660–1677) Birgitte Rosenkrantz (married name: Skeel)
 (1660–1680) Johan Rantzau
 (1660–1680) Jørgen Rantzau
 (1660–1680) Palle Rantzau
 (1677–1695) Jørgen Skeel
 (1695–1700) Benedicte Margrethe Brockdorff (married names: Skeel, Reventlow)
 (1700–1738) Christian Ditlev Reventlow
 (1718–1739) Benedicte Margrethe Brockdorff (married names: Skeel, Reventlow)
 (1739–1750) Conrad Detlev Reventlow
 (1750–1759) Christian Ditlev Reventlow
 (1759–1774) Juliane Frederikke Christiane Reventlow (married name: Hardenberg)
 (1774–1788) Carl August Hardenberg
 (1788–1793) Juliane Frederikke Christiane Reventlow
 (1793–1840) Christian Heinrich August Hardenberg-Reventlow
 (1840–1867) Ida Augusta Hardenberg-Reventlow, (married names: Holck, Gersdorff, D'Almaforte)
 (1867–1885) Carl Ludvig August Rudolph Holck-Hardenberg-Reventlow
 (1885–1903) Princess Lucie of Schönaich-Carolath, (married name: Haugwitz)
 (1903–1921) Heinrich Bernhard Carl Paul Georg Curt Haugwitz-Hardenberg-Reventlow
 (1921–1970) Henrik Ludwig Erdmann Georg Haugwitz-Hardenberg-Reventlow
 (1970–2011) Rupert Gorm Reventlow-Grinling
 (2003–present) Patrick Reventlow-Grinling

References

Literature

Houses completed in 1510
Listed buildings and structures in Guldborgsund Municipality
Manor houses in Guldborgsund Municipality
1510 establishments in Denmark
Buildings and structures associated with the Gøye family
Buildings and structures in Denmark associated with the Brahe family
Buildings and structures associated with the Rosenkrantz family